The America Street School was an historic school at 22 America Street in Providence, Rhode Island. The school was a two-story brick structure, built in 1905 to a design by Frederick E. Field.  It housed ten classrooms (five on each floor), and was one of four similarly sized schools built by the city between 1887 and 1916.  The building served the city as a school until 1955, and was used for a time thereafter as a meeting place for a local branch of the Veterans of Foreign Wars.

The building was listed on the National Register of Historic Places in 1987.  It was listed as one of the "Ten Most Endangered Properties" by the Providence Preservation Society in 1995, and was demolished in 1996.

See also
National Register of Historic Places listings in Providence, Rhode Island

References

School buildings on the National Register of Historic Places in Rhode Island
Buildings and structures in Providence, Rhode Island
Demolished buildings and structures in Rhode Island
National Register of Historic Places in Providence, Rhode Island
School buildings completed in 1905
Buildings and structures demolished in 1996
1905 establishments in Rhode Island